Muhammad Roby (born, 12 September 1985) or usually called M. Roby, is an Indonesian professional footballer who plays as a centre back for Liga 2 club Persiba Balikpapan. He competed in the 2007 Sea Games in Nakhon Ratchasima, Thailand. In 2010, he played for the Indonesia national football team for AFC Asian Cup qualifying matches.

Club career 
On 1 December 2014, he moved to PS Barito Putera.

Honours

Club
Persita Tangerang
 Liga 2 runner-up: 2019

International 
Indonesia
Indonesian Independence Cup: 2008
AFF Championship runner-up: 2010

Individual
 Indonesian Inter Island Cup Best Player: 2012

International goals

|}

References

External links 
 
 

1985 births
Living people
Sportspeople from Jakarta
Indonesian footballers
Indonesia international footballers
Liga 1 (Indonesia) players
Persikad Depok players
Persija Jakarta players
Persik Kediri players
Persisam Putra Samarinda players
Association football defenders
PS Barito Putera players